The Bricks is the second studio album by American rap group the Outsidaz. It was released on June 19, 2001 via Rufflife Records. The record featured guest appearances from Method Man, Redman and Kelis. Audio production was handled by Rockwilder, Mr. Porter, Young Zee, DJ Twinz, Hotrunner, Gov Mattic, Self-Service, with Chris Schwartz served as executive producer. The Bricks peaked at number 68 on the Top R&B/Hip-Hop Albums, number 48 on the Top Heatseekers and number 29 on the Independent Albums charts.

Track listing

Personnel
Outsidaz

Tyree Smith (Axe) - rap (tracks 1, 6, 12, 14-15)
Aubrey King (Az Izz) - rap (tracks 1, 9-10, 12, 15)
Brian Bostic (D.U.) - rap (tracks 4, 6, 8-10, 13-15)
Denton Dawes (Denzy) - rap (tracks 1, 6, 11-12, 15)
Aubrey Polk (DJ Spunk) - scratches (track 1)
Nathaniel Longchamp (Nawshis) - rap (tracks 1, 6, 10, 14-15)
Jerome Hinds (Pace Won) - rap (tracks 1-3, 5, 8-13)
Rashia Tashan Fisher (Rah Digga) - rap (tracks 1, 5, 12)
Larry Cooper (S.A.S.S.) - rap (track 7)
Salih Ibn Al Bayyinah Scaife (Slang Ton) - rap (track 1)
Shakir Nur-al-din Abdullah (Yah Yah) - rap (tracks 1, 6-9, 12-14)
Dewayne Battle (Young Zee) - rap (tracks 1-5, 8-9, 11-13, 15)

Additional credits

Aubrey Williams - producer (tracks 8-9)
Bamba Nazaar - producer (track 12)
Chris Schwartz - executive producer
Clifford Smith - rap (track 3)
Dana Stinson - producer (track 2)
Denaun Porter - producer (track 6)
Edward Hinson - producer (tracks 10-11)
Kelis Rogers - vocals (track 5)
Reggie Noble - rap (track 3)
Robert 'Shea' Taylor - producer (track 13)
Terrance Lovelace - producer (track 5)
Vincent Carroll - vocals (track 15)

Charts

References

2001 albums
Outsidaz albums
Ruffhouse Records albums